Stewart Arnold Brown (January 28, 1942 – July 26, 2019) was a professional ice hockey defenceman in the National Hockey League (NHL), who played for the Toronto Maple Leafs, New York Rangers, Detroit Red Wings, New York Islanders, and Atlanta Flames. After one season in the World Hockey Association (WHA), with the Vancouver Blazers, Michigan Stags and Baltimore Blades, Brown retired in 1975.

In the 2009 book 100 Ranger Greats, the authors ranked Brown at No. 93 all-time of the 901 New York Rangers who had played during the team’s first 82 seasons.

Brown died on July 26, 2019 at the age of 77.

Career statistics

Regular season and playoffs

References

External links

Dual Citizenship: Arnie Brown
Greatest Hockey Legends: Arnie Brown

1942 births
2019 deaths
Atlanta Flames players
Baltimore Blades players
Baltimore Clippers players
Canadian ice hockey defencemen
Detroit Red Wings players
Ice hockey people from Ontario
Michigan Stags players
New York Islanders players
New York Rangers players
Rochester Americans players
Sportspeople from Oshawa
Toronto Maple Leafs players
Vancouver Blazers players